Eric George Millar (1887–13 January 1966) was the Keeper of Manuscripts from 1944 onwards at the British Museum and a scholar interested in English illuminated manuscripts. He produced the two-volume work English Illuminated Manuscripts from the Xth to the XIIIth Century in 1926 and 1928. He also produced a book on the Lindisfarne Gospels and a two-volume catalogue of the Chester Beatty Papyri.

Millar was a member of the Athenaeum Club.

References 

1887 births
1966 deaths
Employees of the British Museum
English art historians